Kearsarge Mountain State Forest is a  state forest in the towns of Warner, Wilmot, Andover, and Salisbury, New Hampshire. In 1922 it encompassed . The state forest covers the summit and most of the slopes of Mount Kearsarge, the highest point in Merrimack County. Winslow State Park is in the northern part of the state forest, and Rollins State Park is at the southern edge.

See also

List of New Hampshire state forests

References

External links
U.S. Geological Survey Map at the U.S. Geological Survey Map Website. Retrieved January 6th, 2023.

New Hampshire state forests
Merrimack County, New Hampshire
State parks of New Hampshire
Parks in Merrimack County, New Hampshire
Warner, New Hampshire
Wilmot, New Hampshire